"It Can Wait" is a song by Australian rapper Illy, featuring Owl Eyes and was released in October 2010 as the second single from Illy's second studio album, The Chase. "It Can Wait" peaked at number 58 on the ARIA Charts and was certified gold in Australia in 2011.

"It Can Wait" was listed at number 29 on the Triple J Hottest 100, 2010.

At the AIR Awards of 2011, the song was nominated for Best Independent single.

Charts

Certifications

References 

2010 singles
2010 songs
Illy (rapper) songs